Doris Molesworth (30 April 1902 – 26 June 1976) was a British swimmer. She competed in the women's 400 metre freestyle event at the 1924 Summer Olympics.

References

External links
 

1902 births
1976 deaths
British female swimmers
Olympic swimmers of Great Britain
Swimmers at the 1924 Summer Olympics
Sportspeople from Birmingham, West Midlands
British female freestyle swimmers